Gujarat has both private and public universities, many of which are supported by the Government of India and the state government - Government of Gujarat. Apart from these there are private universities supported by various bodies and societies. Here is a list of research organisations and educational institutions of Gujarat.

Universities

There are a total of 30 universities in Gujarat as of 4 February 2012. In Gujarat there are one central university, eighteen state universities, two deemed universities and nine private universities.

Central Universities

Institute of National Importance

State Universities

Deemed

Private

Commerce, Management and technology

A. D. Patel Institute of Technology, Vallabh Vidyanagar
Adani Institute of Infrastructure Management, Ahmedabad
B.K. School of Business Management, Ahmedabad
Birla Vishwakarma Mahavidyalaya, Anand
C K Pithawala College of Engineering and Technology, Surat
C. U. Shah College of Engineering and Technology, Surendranagar
Dr. Jivraj Mehta Institute of Technology, Anand
G H Patel College Of Engineering & Technology, Vallabh Vidyanagar
Government Engineering College, Bhavnagar
Government Engineering College, Dahod
Government Engineering College, Gandhinagar
Government Engineering College, Patan
Government Engineering College, Bhuj
Hasmukh Goswami College of Engineering, Ahmedabad
International Institute of Management and Technical Studies, Ahmedabad
K.S. School of Business Management, Ahmedabad
Karnavati University, Ahmedabad
Shri Labhubhai Trivedi Institute of Engineering & Technology, Rajkot
L.J. Institute of Engineering & Technology, Ahmedabad
L. J. Institute of Management Studies, Ahmedabad
Lalbhai Dalpatbhai College of Engineering, Ahmedabad
LDRP Institute of Technology and Research, Gandhinagar
Lukhdhirji Engineering College, Morbi 
Narnarayan Shastri Institute of Technology, Ahmedabad
National Institute of Mass Communication and Journalism - NIMCJ, Ahmedabad
Parul Institute of Engineering and Technology, Vadodara
PDM College of Commerce, Rajkot
Sardar Vallabhbhai Patel Institute of Technology, Vasad
Sarvajanik College of Engineering and Technology, Surat
Shantilal Shah Engineering College, Sidsar, Bhavnagar
Silver Oak College of Engineering and Technology, Ahmedabad
St. Kabir Institute of Professional Studies, Ahmedabad
St. Xavier's College, Ahmedabad
Times Business School, Bodakdev, Ahmedabad
U. V. Patel College of Engineering, Mehsana
Unitedworld School of Business, Ahmedabad
Vishwakarma Government Engineering College, Gandhinagar

Medical colleges 
 AMC MET Medical College, Ahmedabad
 Banas Medical College & research Institute, Palanpur
 B.J. Medical College, Ahmedabad
 Baroda Medical College, Vadodara
 C.U. Shah Medical College, Surendranagar
 Dr Kiran C Patel Medical College & Research Institute, Bharuch
 Dr. M.K. Shah Medical College & Research Centre, Ahmedabad
 Dr. N.D. Desai Faculty of Medical Science and Research, Nadiad
 GCS Medical College and Research Center, Ahmedabad
 Government Medical College, Bhavnagar
 Government Medical College, Surat
 GMERS Medical College, Sola, Ahmedabad
 GMERS Medical College, Gotri, Vadodara
 GMERS Medical College, Gandhinagar
 GMERS Medical College, Dharpur, Patan
 GMERS Medical College, Valsad
 GMERS Medical College, Junagadh
 GMERS Medical College, Himmatnagar
 GMERS Medical College, Vadnagar
 Gujarat Adani Institute of Medical Sciences, Bhuj
 M. P. Shah Medical College, Jamnagar
 Nootan Medical College and Research Centre, Visnagar
 Pandit Deendayal Upadhyay Medical College, Rajkot
 Parul Institute of Medical Science and Research, Limda, Waghodiya, Vadodara
 Pramukh Swami Medical College, Karamsad
 Shantabaa Medical College, Amreli
Smt. NHL Municipal Medical College, Ahmedabad
 Surat Municipal Institute of Medical Education and Research
 Zydus Medical Collage and Hospital, Dahod

Autonomous institutes

Research organizations 
 Ahmedabad Textile Industry's Research Association, Ahmedabad
 Bhaskaracharya Institute For Space Applications and Geo-Informatics, Gandhinagar
 Central Salt and Marine Chemicals Research Institute, Bhavnagar
Institute for Plasma Research, Gandhinagar
 Physical Research Laboratory, Ahmedabad

See also 
 Education in Gujarat
 Education in Ahmedabad

References

External links 
 Department of Education, Government of India
 Education Department, Government of Gujarat
 Gujarat Secondary and Higher Secondary Education Board

Education in Gujarat
Gujarat
Education